Stinger, in comics may refer to:

 Stinger (Marvel Comics), a fictional mutant in the Marvel Comics Universe
 Stinger (Genetix), a member of Genetix in the Marvel UK comics
 Stinger, the alias of Cassandra Lang in the MC2 universe
Stinger II, fought the Avengers in Avengers #179-180 (January-February 1979)
Stinger IV, a clone of Scott Lang that fought the Heroes for Hire in Heroes for Hire #12 (June 1998)
Stinger, an enemy of the Golden Age Angel, who also appeared in Marvel Super-Heroes vol. 3 #7 (October 1991)